Jungle Cat World, originally named "Orono Exotic Cat World," is a wildlife park that was established in 1983. It is located in Orono, Ontario, Canada, approximately 45 minutes east of Toronto off of Highway 35/115. Jungle Cat World is open year round and is home to more than 150 animals.

The zoo has faced accusations of mistreatment of their animals by the World Animal Protection Association and other animal rights organizations.

The park was formerly accredited by the Canadian Association of Zoos and Aquariums (CAZA) and the World Association of Zoos and Aquariums (WAZA).

Features
Jungle Cat World's Night Safari is a guided tour around the wildlife park at night. This allows the public an opportunity to observe some of the activities of the nocturnal animals. "Behind the Scenes" is a private forty-five-minute program with an Animal Coordinator. It offers hands on experience and a photo opportunity with three of the animals at the zoo. Jungle Cat World also has a bed and breakfast lodge.

Safari Zoo Camp
Jungle Cat World has offered an overnight summer camp called Safari Zoo Camp since 1995. Between the end of June and the end of August, approximately 300 campers, from ages 6 to 17, come each year to experience one of the nine Zoo Camp sessions. Situated on the Jungle Cat World property, the campground and sleeping quarters are located outside of the zoo's perimeter. Safari Zoo Camp allows campers to gain hands-on experience zoo keeping and handling animals and reptiles. Senior campers have the opportunity to present and feed animals during the feeding tours and to present and handle animals at Wildlife Safari Outreach Presentations in the surrounding community. In 2011, Safari Zoo Camp was named as one of the top ten greenest summer camps in North America. The camp has also been accredited as a member of the Ontario Camps Association.

Education
Jungle Cat World was founded as a tourist attraction to show exotic animals, primarily for recreation. Over the years, the park has taken a much more active role in educating visitors. Every day, a zookeeper leads an educational feeding tour around the wildlife park, during which the large cats, wolves, and primates are fed.

Accusations of Animal mistreatment
World Animal Protection and other animal rights groups have accused Jungle Cat World of mistreating their animals. The park is known for its opportunities for selfies and photo ops with wildlife including baby lions and tigers. Melissa Matlow, the campaign director for World Animal Protection in Canada described these photo ops as "not educational and...cruel.” The report also found that Jungle Cat World forces tigers to be awake during the day to perform even though tigers are nocturnal and separate tigers from their mother.

The Animal Alliance Of Canada has been a frequent critic of Jungle Cat World. In a 2016 report, they found exhibits overgrown with weeds and animals pacing in stereotypical fashion.

In 2018, the park lost its WAZA accreditation and later resigned from the Canadian Association of Accredited Zoos and Aquariums following inspections.

Escapes
Animals have escaped from the zoo in the past. In 2011, a wolf escaped and was shot by a local resident.

References

External links

Zoos in Ontario
Zoos established in 1983